Synbio may refer to:

Synthetic Biology, an area of biological research that combines science and engineering.
SynBio, a biological research project based in Russia, which is developing treatments against types of cancer and other diseases.